Robin Williams (1951–2014) was an American actor and stand-up comedian.

Robin Williams may also refer to:

People
 Robin Murphy Williams (1914–2006), American sociology professor at Cornell University
 Robin Williams (academic) (born 1952), British professor at University of Edinburgh
 Robin Williams (canoeist), British slalom canoeist
 Robin Williams (rowing coach) (born 1959), British rowing coach
 Robin Williams (folk musician) (born 1947), American folk musician
 Robin Williams (physicist) (born 1941), Welsh physicist and academic
 Robin Williams (writer) (born 1953), computers and graphic design
 Robin Williams (mathematician) (1919–2013), New Zealand mathematician, university administrator and public servant
 Robin L. Williams (born 1961), member of the Georgia House of Representatives
 Robin F. Williams (born 1984), American painter

Other uses
 12820 Robinwilliams, an asteroid
 "Robin Williams", a song by CeeLo Green from his 2015 album Heart Blanche

See also
 Robyn Williams (born 1944), Australian scientist, journalist and educator
 Robyn Williams (cricketer) (born 1986), Australian cricketer
 Robyn Clay-Williams, one of the first two female Australian military pilots (as Robyn Williams) and an academic
 Robbie Williams (disambiguation)

Williams, Robin